The McLaren MP4/10 was the Formula One car with which the McLaren team competed in the 1995 Formula One World Championship. The chassis was designed by Neil Oatley, Steve Nichols, Matthew Jeffreys, David North, David Neilson, Paddy Lowe  and Henri Durand with Mario Illien designing the bespoke Ilmor engine. It was driven mainly by Mark Blundell, who started the year without a drive, and Mika Häkkinen, who was in his second full season with the team. The car was also driven by  champion Nigel Mansell, and Jan Magnussen.

Early season
1995 was a season of great expectation for McLaren. The disappointing  alliance with Peugeot had been annulled, and Mercedes-Benz switched to the team from Sauber including third-party engine builder partnership with Ilmor Engineering Ltd. after Ilmor decided to reposition its Formula One program by becoming a third-party engine builder and assembler, and thus earned full-factory works support from Mercedes-Benz. In addition, Mansell had been tempted out of retirement from his two prior years spent in the Indy Car series to partner the youthful Häkkinen. The MP4/10 was a radical design, incorporating a high "needle"-nose design and a wing mounted atop the airbox, among other innovations.

However, it became apparent that Mansell was unable to fit properly in the narrow cockpit which affected his elbows and hips, that meant he was forced to miss the first two races of the season whilst a wider monocoque was built. His racing return lasted just two further Grands Prix, in San Marino and Spain, before leaving the team altogether, disgusted with the car's poor performance. Blundell, who had replaced Mansell for both the Brazil and Argentina, became a permanent race driver.

Despite handling problems due to a lack of front-end grip, and an often unreliable engine, the package proved competitive enough for the team to usually be "best of the rest", behind Benetton, Williams and Ferrari, and Häkkinen was able to score two podium finishes. Team-mate Blundell also took several points finishes.

Upgrades

The McLaren MP4/10B update made its debut at San Marino and was retained for most of the season. A further modification, the MP4/10C, appeared at the Portuguese and European Grands Prix, but was not used further.

McLaren endured a mixed end to the season. Häkkinen missed the Pacific Grand Prix with a case of appendicitis and was replaced by the rookie Jan Magnussen, but returned to finish a fine second in Japan. This was tempered by the fact that Blundell wrote off a chassis in practice, but this setback paled in comparison to Häkkinen's accident during qualifying for the final race of the season in Australia. A sudden left-rear puncture saw his car fly out of control and hit a concrete wall at high speed. Häkkinen was pulled out of his car unconscious with blood pouring from his mouth and nose.

The team eventually finished fourth in the Constructors' Championship, with 30 points. The McLaren MP4/10 was the first McLaren car to run Mobil fuel before rebranding to Esso in 2015, beginning with the McLaren MP4-30.

Complete Formula One results
(key)

References

External links

McLaren Formula One cars
1995 Formula One season cars